Tsarikha is a rural locality (a village) in Kumzerskoye Rural Settlement, Kharovsky District, Vologda Oblast, Russia.

Population 
The population was 8 as of 2002.

Geography 
Tsarikha is located 52 km northwest of Kharovsk (the district's administrative centre) by road. Ustrechnaya is the nearest rural locality.

References 

Rural localities in Kharovsky District